New Zealand (the All Blacks) and South Africa (the Springboks) have been playing Test Match Rugby against each other since 1921 when the All Blacks beat the Springboks in Dunedin 13-5. It is one of the biggest rivalries in World Rugby history. There is considerable history behind these matches, much of it off the field. In 1981, there were protests in New Zealand over the Springboks coming to New Zealand due to the then South African government's policy of Apartheid. Up until 1996 New Zealand had never won a series in South Africa but South Africa had won a series in New Zealand in 1937. The All Blacks and Springboks have played each other 103 times, with the All Blacks leading the series 61 to 38, with 4 matches drawn.

Since 2004 New Zealand and South Africa have contested the Freedom Cup, it has been included as part of the Rugby Championship since 2006.

Summary

Overall

Records
Note: Date shown in brackets indicates when the record was or last set.

Results

List of series

Rugby Championship Era: SANZAAR confirmed in June 2022 that the 12-match schedule for The Rugby Championship (TRC) would comprise an innovative 'mini-tour' format that is a departure from the previous home and away structure that has been in place since 2012 when Argentina joined Australia, New Zealand and South Africa to create The Rugby Championship.

Venues

In New Zealand

In South Africa

Points

Individual
Note:Active players in bold

See also
 New Zealand Cavaliers
 Rugby union in New Zealand
 Rugby union in South Africa

References

External links
Complete List of Results at ESPN
New Zealand v South Africa Head to Head on Allblacks.com
Statistics for New Zealand vs South Africa on Rugbydata.com

 
New Zealand national rugby union team matches
South Africa national rugby union team matches
Rugby union rivalries in South Africa
Rugby union rivalries in New Zealand
Rugby union